Briģi parish is an administrative unit of Ludza Municipality in the Latgale region of Latvia (prior to 2009 of the former Ludza District).

Towns, villages and settlements of Briģi parish 
 Briģi

References 

Parishes of Latvia
Ludza Municipality
Latgale